Night Owl is the third studio album by Scottish musician Gerry Rafferty. It was released a year after Rafferty's Platinum-selling album City to City. While not quite performing as well as its predecessor, Night Owl still managed enough sales to achieve platinum status in Canada, gold in the United Kingdom, and gold status in the U.S. The title song reached No. 5 on the UK charts. The album made the UK Top 10.

The album was recorded at Chipping Norton Recording Studios, Chipping Norton, England.

"Take the Money and Run" appears on the 1980 release Free Fall as "Take the Money."

Re-releases
On 30 January 2007 Collectables Records released City To City and Night Owl as a two-disc set.

Track listing

Personnel 
 Gerry Rafferty – vocals, acoustic piano (2, 9) Polymoog (2), acoustic guitar (3–8, 10), string arrangements
 Graham Preskett – acoustic piano (1, 4, 10), electric piano (2), string synthesizer (2), keyboards (6, 7), fiddles (6, 7), mandolin (10), string arrangements, string scoring and conductor
 Pete Wingfield – organ (1, 2, 3)
 Tommy Eyre – acoustic piano (3), electric piano (5), synthesizers (5)
 John Kirkpatrick – accordion (4, 6, 7)
 Richard Brunton – electric guitar (1, 3, 6, 7), lap steel guitar (1, 4, 10), acoustic guitar (3, 4, 7–10), guitar solo (7), guitars (10)
 Hugh Burns – electric guitar (1, 4), rhythm guitar (1, 9), guitar solo (1, 9), guitars (2, 5)
 Richard Thompson –mandolin (4), electric guitars (7, 8)
 Mo Foster – bass (1, 2, 4, 6–10)
 Gary Taylor – bass (3, 5)
 Liam Genockey – drums
 Frank Ricotti – percussion (1, 2, 5, 6, 8, 9)
 Raphael Ravenscroft – Lyricon (2), saxophone (5, 6, 9, 10)
 Richard Harvey – penny whistle (6), pipe organ (7), recorders (7), synthesizers (8, 9)
 Gavyn Wright – string leader
 Betsy Cook – backing vocals (1, 3)
 Barbara Dickson – backing vocals (1, 3, 7)
 Linda Thompson – backing vocals (1, 3)

Production 
 Gerry Rafferty – producer 
 Hugh Murphy – producer 
 Barry Hammond – engineer (1, 2, 4, 6–10)
 Nick Patrick – engineer (3, 5)
 John Patrick Byrne – front cover painting
 Robert Ellis – photography

Charts
Album

Single

Certifications

References

External links

Gerry Rafferty albums
1979 albums
United Artists Records albums